Agonum suturale is a species of ground beetle in the Platyninae subfamily that is endemic to the United States.

References

Beetles described in 1830
suturale
Endemic fauna of the United States
Beetles of North America